A lunar day is the period of time for Earth's Moon to complete one rotation on its axis with respect to the Sun. Due to tidal locking, this equals the time that the Moon takes to complete one orbit around Earth (Earth rise to Earth set) plus about 2.2 more Earth days to return to the same Moon phase (due to the Moon's orbit around the Sun). The lunar day is roughly 29  Earth days, the length of a lunar month, and the time of which includes a full day-night cycle.

Main definition
Relative to the fixed stars on the celestial sphere, the Moon takes 27 Earth days, 7 hours, 43 minutes, 12 seconds to complete one orbit; however, since the Earth–Moon system advances around the Sun at the same time, the Moon must travel farther to return to the same phase. On average, this synodic period lasts 29 days, 12 hours, 44 minutes, 3 seconds, the length of a lunar month on Earth. The exact length varies over time because the speed of the Earth–Moon system around the Sun varies slightly during a year due to the eccentricity of its elliptical orbit, variances in orbital velocity, and a number of other periodic and evolving variations about its observed, relative, mean values, which are influenced by the gravitational perturbations of the Sun and other bodies in the Solar System.

As a result, daylight at a given point on the Moon would last approximately two weeks from beginning to end, followed by approximately two weeks of lunar night.

Alternate usage 

 The term lunar day may also refer to the period between moonrises or high moon in a particular location on Earth. This period is typically about 50 minutes longer than a 24-hour Earth day, as the Moon orbits the Earth in the same direction as the Earth's axial rotation.
 The term lunar day is also used in the context of night and day, i.e., opposite to the lunar night.  This is common in discussions of the huge difference in temperatures, such as discussion about lunar rovers. For example, "the Soviet Union's Luna missions [...] were designed to survive one lunar day (two Earth weeks).", or, China's Yutu-2 rover, which landed in January 2019, was designed to survive lunar nights by shutting down.

Lunar calendars 

In some lunar calendars, such as the Vikram Samvat, a lunar day, or tithi, is defined as 1/30 of a lunar month, or the time it takes for the longitudinal angle between the Moon and the Sun to increase by 12 degrees. By this definition, lunar days generally vary in duration.

See also
Lunisolar calendar
Sol, the name for a Martian solar day

References

External links
 Lunar days and other lunar data for many different cities. Lunarium.co.uk.
 Lunar Standard Time (LST)  lunarclock.org.

Day
Day, lunar